Barnes Butte is a rhyolite dome of volcanic rock in Crook County, Oregon, United States located partly within the city of Prineville. Barnes Butte is composed of welded tuff and is a part of the Crooked River caldera. It was the site of a 1940s mercury mine. In 2015, a BLM cleanup of mercury was done to reduce the health risk to residents of nearby IronHorse neighborhood and the Barnes Butte Elementary School.

The butte is a recreational area and includes the IronHorse hiking trail, a  loop that includes a hike to the summit.

The butte is considered one of three popular landmarks near Prineville and has been set aside for scenic preservation.

References 

Buttes of Oregon
Landforms of Crook County, Oregon
Mountains of Oregon
Volcanoes of Crook County, Oregon
Volcanoes of Oregon